Karnak is a fictional superhero appearing in American comic books published by Marvel Comics. He was created by Stan Lee and Jack Kirby and debuted in Fantastic Four (vol. 1) #45 (1965) along with other members of the Inhuman Royal Family.

The character Karnak Mander-Azur was never exposed to the Terrigen Mists, so he never developed additional powers like other Inhumans, but he is a martial artist who can find the weakness in anything and then use his training and strength to exploit it. Although the Jack Kirby Collector described him as "a philosophical karate expert with nominal personality" in 2004, subsequent writers have made use of his skill for puzzle-solving and strategic-planning in Inhumans' stories, leading to him being given his first solo series in 2015.

Karnak made his live-action debut in the 2017 Marvel Cinematic Universe (MCU) television series Inhumans, portrayed by Ken Leung.

Publication history

Karnak first appeared in Fantastic Four #45, and was created by Stan Lee and Jack Kirby, as part of their run on the title that helped lay the foundations for the Marvel Universe.

As a core member of the Inhumans, he has appeared in the group's own series over the years, including the 1998 Inhumans twelve-issue limited series by Paul Jenkins and Jae Lee, the Silent War mini-series by David Hine and Frazer Irving in 2007, and Secret Invasion: Inhumans in the following year.

Karnak is the narrator of Inhumanity #1 (February 2014) because his abilities gave writer Matt Fraction a way to frame the story:

Although he commits suicide at the end of that issue, he appears in the cliffhanger of Inhuman #13 (May 2015) saying he had found a weakness in the afterlife. This allowed writer Charles Soule to bring the character back, and he explained Karnak's importance:

Karnak will get his first eponymous series as part of the All-New, All-Different Marvel line emerging from 2015's "Secret Wars" storyline and the first issue of his series will feature a monster variant cover of Rommbu from Tales to Astonish #19 drawn by Eric Powell. Karnak is part of a wider push the Inhumans are getting across Marvel's media output - on television (in Agents of S.H.I.E.L.D.), in film (with the upcoming Inhumans) and in print (with the A-N, A-DM relaunch including the team books All-New Inhumans and Uncanny Inhumans, alongside the other solo titles Ms. Marvel vol. 4 and Moon Girl and Devil Dinosaur). Editor-in-Chief Axel Alonso has said that the specific series came about because "Nick Lowe was looking to build the Inhumans line with a solo book or two and suggested Karnak as a character to spotlight. I didn't need to be sold on Karnak, who's far and away my favorite Inhuman". They picked Warren Ellis to write the title because of his earlier stints at Marvel reworking their characters. Ellis, who is joined by Gerardo Zaffino on art duties, described what drew him to the character:

With regard to the inspiration behind Karnak's new form, Ellis states:

Fictional character biography
Karnak is a member of the Inhuman race, one of those who form the Inhuman Royal Family, born on the island of Attilan. Cousin of Black Bolt, king of the Inhumans, Karnak has the ability to find the weak point in any person, plan, or object. Thus, he is usually used as planner by the Inhumans.  He also serves as a priest and philosopher to the Inhumans.

He is the brother of Triton, who endured Terrigenesis before he did. However, Triton's Terrigenesis was so extreme that his parents, Mander and Azur, begged that Karnak not have to endure the procedure. Instead, he was sent to a monastery, where he learned martial arts.

He is usually attended by his relatives, Gorgon and Triton. He has taken part in most of the Inhumans' adventures, such as the Kree-Skrull War, and the many moves of the Inhuman city of Attilan.

Karnak and the Royal Family encounter Maximus' creation, the Trikon, and are driven from Attilan's Great Refuge in exile.

Karnak first appeared as a member of the Inhumans when he attempted to retrieve his cousin and queen, Medusa from the outside world and take her back to Attilan. This led him into conflict with the Fantastic Four, the first humans he met, who were harboring Medusa after rescuing her from the villainous Frightful Four. Accordingly, Karnak is indirectly responsible for revealing the existence of Attilan to the outside world. Karnak battled Maximus alongside the Inhuman Royal Family, and became trapped in Maximus' "negative zone" barrier around the Great Refuge. He was freed from the "negative zone" barrier along with the rest of the Inhumans by the Fantastic Four and left the Great Refuge with the Royal Family to visit the outside world. He teamed with the Thing, Human Torch, and Black Panther against the Psycho-Man. He aided the Inhuman Royal Family in defeating Maximus' next attempt to overthrow the Great Refuge.

He later assisted Gorgon in freeing Maximus. He journeyed to America to search for the missing Black Bolt. Gorgon battled Magneto and his mutated minions.

Karnak later battled Blastaar and the Kree Kaptroids. He traveled to New York City, where he battled Kree agent Shatterstar. Karnak was imprisoned by Maximus. He aided in the defeat of Maximus and the Evil Inhumans. Karnak then left Earth with the Inhuman Royal Family to prevent the Kree subjugation of the Inhumans, and battled various aliens. He continued to battle Kree agents, and then returned to Earth. Karnak later accompanied the Inhuman exodus when Attilan was relocated to the Blue Area of Earth's Moon.

Karnak later battled the Avengers while under Maximus' mind control. He then battled the High Evolutionary's forces during the Evolutionary War. He accompanied Medusa to Earth when she fled Attilan to avoid a compulsory abortion.

He was later sent to Earth with Gorgon in an attempt to find Black Bolt's missing son with Daredevil's help. There he and his companions fought against Ultron-13 in which Karnak's power allowed him to discover the weak spot in Ultron's neck. Later they became entangled in Mephisto's plot against Daredevil, and were transported to a netherworld where they were personally attacked by the supernatural entity known as Blackheart. Karnak's animosity towards Gorgon was fanned into a rage, causing actual physical violence. Blackheart was soon defeated and the group went their intended ways.

Karnak aids the New Warriors against the third Star-Thief. Alongside X-Factor, he then battles Apocalypse. He also helps the Avengers battle Thane Ector. Karnak joins an Inhuman strike team to help defeat the confused super-powered Sentry.

During the Secret Invasion, Karnak encounters a Skrull in the form of Toros. Karnak engages it and learns that it can copy his powers. Karnak manages to defeat the Toros-Skrull by sending it out the window where it was impaled on a fence.

Following Attilan's destruction during the Infinity storyline, Karnak goes on a rampage in New York at the start of the Inhumanity storyline. He is stopped and imprisoned by the Avengers. After warning Medusa to forget what she knows in order to prepare for a coming cataclysm, Karnak commits suicide by leaping out of one of the windows in Avengers Tower. Months pass by and the Terrigen Mists that spread throughout the world during Inhumanity have revealed Inhuman hybrids living among humans, dubbed the NuHumans. Medusa reveals their existence to the general public, and NuHumans become integrated into New Attilan society. One NuHuman named Lineage joins Medusa's council, taking Karnak's place. Lineage's power is having the knowledge of all his ancestors. Lineage plans to use the Inhuman genome to destroy humanity and rule the Inhumans. Meanwhile, Karnak has wound up in a strange afterlife that he believes to be hell. He and an ally he meets here plans to escape this place, and they successfully find a door out while holding off strange creatures. Karnak uses his ability to see the weakness in things to open the door, and finds himself bursting out of Lineage's chest in the real world, killing Lineage in the process. He realizes that what he thought was Hell was inside Lineage, as Karnak is one of his ancestors. Karnak tells Medusa he knows that she has been an outstanding queen in his absence and rejoins her council.

During the Civil War II storyline, Karnak was at New Attilan when Iron Man infiltrated it to claim Ulysses. Alongside Medusa and Crystal, Karnak was defeated by Iron Man and made off with Ulysses. Karnak joined Medusa, Crystal, and the Inhumans with them for a trip to Stark Tower. He nearly leveled it with his powers until the Avengers, the Ultimates, and S.H.I.E.L.D. arrived. Karnak was present when Ulysses projected his latest vision that involved a rampaging Hulk standing over the corpses of the superheroes.

During the Inhumans vs. X-Men storyline, Karnak is attacked by a time-displaced Jean Grey who telepathically traps him.

During the Secret Empire storyline, Karnak joins up with Daisy Johnson's Secret Warriors. While driving West, the Warriors encounter the Howling Commandos after falling into a trap. After escaping, the team is found by the X-Men.

Powers and abilities

Karnak has enhanced strength, stamina, durability, agility, and reflexes as a result of his genetically superior Inhuman physiology. Unlike most other Inhumans, he does not have superhuman powers because he was never exposed to the mutagenic Terrigen Mist. Instead, Karnak has the extrasensory ability (achieved through meditation and intensive training) to perceive stress points, fracture planes, or weaknesses in objects or persons. He has complete voluntary control of most of his autonomic bodily functions. All striking surfaces of his body are extremely toughened. He is capable of shattering substances up to and including mild steel and rendering superhuman opponents unconscious by striking them.

Like all Inhumans, Karnak's immune system is weaker than that of an average human.

Karnak has received his fighting skills as a result of Inhuman royal militia training.  He is also a graduate of the religious seminary, at the Tower of Wisdom in Attilan.

He uses a hover-platform for transportation designed by Inhuman technicians.

Other versions

Amalgam Comics
In Amalgam Comics, Triserinak - a combination of DC's Serifan and Marvel's Triton and Karnak - is a member of the superhero group Un-People in Amalgam Comics universe.

Earth X
In the alternate future of Earth X, Karnak has undergone a further mutation. His cranium has greatly increased and his features are now more sunken. During an investigative mission to Earth, he attempts to act as a calming influence among the members of the Royal Family. He has altered his uniform in order to expose his powerful limbs.

In the sequel Paradise X, he is shown as having exiled himself from his own people, seeing the marriage of Medusa and the King of Brittan as a betrayal of Black Bolt's memory and the superiority of the Inhumans.

Exiles
In Exiles, Karnak appears as one of the many heroes overtaken by a mutated version of the techno-organic Phalanx.

Heroes Reborn
In the Heroes Reborn continuity, Karnak lives with the other Inhumans, hidden on Earth. His society pays reverence to Galactus and his many heralds via statues. Karnak dresses in a more stylized version of his 616 uniform.

Marvel Zombies
In the Marvel Zombies continuity, Karnak is seen as one of the many zombies trying to bring down the Silver Surfer. He turns up again in a sequel to the story, visiting the "clone pens" of a zombified Kingpin. He is shredded by a chainsaw when he battles Earth-616's Machine Man. Another version, from Earth Z, is seen assisting in eating the Warbound. In a flashback series, Karnak is one of the many heroes fighting a last-ditch effort to evacuate as many un-infected humans to an alternate reality.

Mutant X
In Mutant X, Karnak joins with his fellow Inhumans and a team of Eternals to confront the murderous duo of the Beyonder and Dracula. Inhumans and Eternals alike are all killed and Dracula drains them.

Ultimate Marvel
In the Ultimate Marvel continuity, the Ultimate version of Karnak was introduced in Ultimate Fantastic Four Annual #1. Here, he is a member of the Inhuman royal family. His power is the ability to sense and control energy, for example, he sensed the stress-points in Sue Storm's invisible force-field, and attacked it with a bolt of electricity.

Collected editions

In other media

Television
 Karnak alongside the other Inhumans appeared in The New Fantastic Four episode "Medusa and the Inhumans", voiced by John Stephenson.
 Karnak appears among the other Inhumans in several episodes of Fantastic Four, voiced by Clyde Kusatsu.
 Karnak appears in the Hulk and the Agents of S.M.A.S.H. episode "Inhuman Nature", voiced by Fred Tatasciore. He appears with the Inhuman Royal Family in a confrontation against the Agents of S.M.A.S.H.. Red Hulk fights against Karnak which he maintained causing damage to the weak point of Red's weapon by splitting it in half. Then, in a truce, he discovers that Maxiums secretly builds a weapon that will end all humanity.
 Karnak appears in Ultimate Spider-Man, voiced again by Fred Tatasciore. In the episode "Inhumanity", Karnak is hypnotized by Maximus, who seized the city from them to cause a war against humanity, until he was released by Spider-Man. In the episode "Agent Web", Karnak was with the royal family of Inhumans when they confront Spider-Man and Triton outside the abandoned city of Atarog, until he asked for forgiveness, but it was in taking them to Triskelion.
 Karnak appears in Guardians of the Galaxy, voiced by Oliver Vaquer. In the episode "Crystal Blue Persuasion", he appears in cameo at the end. In the episode "Inhuman Touch", Karnak and Gorgon help Milano land and then help repair it. Karnak even vowed to find Drax the Destroyer's weak point. Karnak later helps the Guardians of the Galaxy when Maximus does a trick on his way out of prison.
 Karnak appears in Avengers Assemble, voiced again by Oliver Vaquer. In the episode "Inhumans Among Us", appears with Black Bolt, Medusa, Gorgon, and Lockjaw when a ship carrying Seeker to the Inhumans and Primitive Alphas crashes into the mountains near Maple Falls. During the Avengers' fight with the Inhumans, Iron Man fought Karnak who he maintained causing damage to the weak spots in Iron Man's armor. When Inferno emerges from his Terrigen cocoon, the Avengers and Inhumans had to work together to stop Inferno. In the episode "The Inhuman Condition", Karnak appears in scene, is among the Inhumans who are captured by Ultron. Later he is released by the Avengers. In the episode "Civil War, Part 4: Avengers Revolution", Karnak is being controlled by Ultron and alongside Gorgon and Inferno, to attack the Avengers.

 Karnak appears in the live-action Marvel Cinematic Universe (MCU) television series Inhumans for ABC and IMAX theaters, portrayed by Ken Leung. After Maximus usurps the throne, Karnak is teleported by Lockjaw to Hawaii. He falls from a cliff and hits his head, throwing off his senses and causing him to be unable to accurately measure things. Karnak soon comes across some illegal cannabis farmers who reluctantly bring him in. He then begins developing a relationship with Jen, one of the cannabis farmers. Karnak and Jen are forced to flee when Reno begins to murder his partners. After reuniting Karnak with his family, Jen leaves to call the cops with Karnak being amused at the fact that she lasted longer than other woman he's been with as he gives his calculation of it: one day, six hours and forty-two minutes. Karnak and Gorgon leave to rescue Black Bolt's allies, Sammy and Dr. Evan Declan. While they manage to defeat Auran and her team, Mordis, a volatile Inhuman, unleashes his energy, killing himself and Gorgon in the building collapse and leaving Karnak devastated. He becomes determined to bring him back to life and during a failed parley, notices that Auran was uncomfortable. With his powers restored, Karnak teams up with Auran to use her DNA to bring Gorgon back through a second terrigenesis. He discovers later on, that the terrigenesis worked, but had made Gorgon unfocused. Karnak manages to speak to him and promises to help in any way he can. Black Bolt and Medusa understand what Karnak had to do and will hold him responsible if he does anything wrong. When he learns that Maximus' failsafe to destroy the dome cannot be stopped, he helps evacuate the city as he and his family escape through Lockjaw. Karnak was last seen with the evacuated Inhumans as Medusa gives a speech about them finding a new home on Earth.
 Karnak appears in Marvel Future Avengers, voiced by Hiroyuki Kinoshita in Japanese and Grant George in English.

Video games
 Karnak appears as a non-player character in Marvel: Ultimate Alliance, voiced by Michael Gough.
 Karnak appears as a playable character in Marvel Contest of Champions.
 Karnak appears as a playable character in Marvel: Future Fight.
 Karnak appears as a playable character in Marvel Puzzle Quest.

Toys
 Karnak appears as one of the 12 unique Heroclix figures included in the Marvel Supernova set. His collectors number is #088. He is appropriately equipped with many clicks of exploit weakness and has powerful attack and damage numbers.

References

External links
 Karnak at Marvel.com
 Karnak (Earth-616) at the Marvel Database
 
The Inhumans at Don Markstein's Toonopedia. Archived from the original on September 17, 2016.

2015 comics debuts
Characters created by Jack Kirby
Characters created by Stan Lee
Comics by Warren Ellis
Comics characters introduced in 1965
Fictional characters with superhuman durability or invulnerability
Fictional male martial artists
Fictional priests and priestesses
Inhumans
Marvel Comics characters with superhuman strength
Marvel Comics male superheroes
Marvel Comics martial artists
Marvel Comics titles
Marvel Comics television characters